The BMU Bridge over Wind River is a Parker through truss bridge located near Ethete, Wyoming, that carries Wyoming Highway 132 across the Wind River. The bridge was built circa 1935 as one of seven Parker truss bridges commissioned by the Wyoming Highway Department. It was moved to its current location in 1953–54.

The bridge was added to the National Register of Historic Places on February 22, 1985. It was one of several bridges added to the NRHP for their role in the history of Wyoming bridge construction.

See also
List of bridges documented by the Historic American Engineering Record in Wyoming

References

External links

Road bridges on the National Register of Historic Places in Wyoming
Buildings and structures in Fremont County, Wyoming
Historic American Engineering Record in Wyoming
National Register of Historic Places in Fremont County, Wyoming
Parker truss bridges in the United States
Demolished but still listed on the National Register of Historic Places